The 1985–86 Romanian Hockey League season was the 56th season of the Romanian Hockey League. Eight teams participated in the league, and Steaua Bucuresti won the championship.

First round

Final round

External links
hochei.net

Romania
Romanian Hockey League seasons
Rom